Darb-e Abu ol Abbas (also Romanized as Darb-e Abū ol ‘Abbās; also known as Darb) is a village in Mongasht Rural District, in the Central District of Bagh-e Malek County, Khuzestan Province, Iran. At the 2006 census, its population was 422, in 74 families.

References 

Populated places in Bagh-e Malek County